During the 1994–95 English football season, Coventry City F.C. competed in the FA Premier League.

Season summary
In the 1994–95 season, Coventry struggled for most of the campaign despite the £2million arrival of striker Dion Dublin from Manchester United on 9 September, and Neal was sacked on 14 February 1995 despite a 2–0 away win over fellow strugglers Crystal Palace three days earlier, which saw them 17th in the Premier League and two places above the relegation zone. Neal's successor Ron Atkinson ensured the Sky Blues' survival.

Kit
Coventry City's kit was manufactured by Pony and sponsored by Peugeot.

Final league table

Results summary

Results by round

Results
Coventry City's score comes first

Legend

FA Premier League

FA Cup

League Cup

Squad
Squad at end of season

Left club during season

Reserve squad

Transfers

In

Out

Transfers in:  £4,750,000
Transfers out:  £4,520,000
Total spending:  £230,000

Awards
 PFA Merit Award: Gordon Strachan

References

Coventry City F.C. seasons
Coventry City